Damian Paul Maffei (born June 27, 1977) is an American actor. He appeared in the thriller film Closed for the Season (2010) and played an antagonist in the slasher films The Strangers: Prey at Night (2018) and Haunt (2019).

Film

Theatre

References

External links
 
 Official Website

American male film actors
Male actors from New York City
American male stage actors
People from Maspeth, Queens
Living people
1977 births